The long-running British science fiction television series Doctor Who has featured many robots. The Daleks and Cybermen are not listed, as they are depicted as organic beings that become cyborgs as opposed to true robots.

A

Anne Droid

Auton

B

Bracewell

C

Cleaners

Clockwork Robot

D

Davinadroid

Drathro

E

Emojibot

H

Handbot

Heavenly Host

K

K1 

The Doctor's first enemy in his fourth incarnation. He is the main villain during ‘’Robot’’.

K9 

The Doctor's faithful robotic dog companion, from the middle to end of his fourth incarnation. The original model was acquired by the Doctor during The Invisible Enemy.

Kamelion 

A shape-shifting android acquired by the Fifth Doctor as a companion at the end of the two-part story The King's Demons (1983). Kamelion was weak-willed, so The Master was able to take control of him twice.

Kandyman

Kerb!am Man

M

Mechonoid 

Mechonoids are large, multifaceted, spherical robots created by humans. Sent to prepare the planet Mechanus for colonisation, they kept stranded astronaut Steven Taylor prisoner as he did not have their control codes. Daleks, pursuing the TARDIS crew, engaged the Mechonoids in battle; which side was victorious is not shown.

The Mechonoids (spelt "Mechanoids") next appeared in the TV21 comic strip story The Eve of War, the story running from December 1965 to January 1966. They are depicted as the sworn enemies of the Daleks. A race of blue-skinned humanoids subtly interfere with events, using a robot called K2, in order to prevent a war. This was followed by a further comic strip appearance (where they are again termed "Mechanoids") in the story The World That Waits, included in the 1966 The Dalek World annual. The narrative depicts a Dalek attack on Mechanus which results in the destruction of the Mechanoid city.

War of the Daleks (1997), an Eighth Doctor BBC Books novel written by John Peel, features a Mechonoid identified as Mechon 179. It works as a gardener on the planet Hesperus and is destroyed helping to defend it against a Daleks invasion.

The Mechonoids appear in the Big Finish audio drama The Juggernauts (2005). In this story Davros adds human nervous tissue to robotic Mechonoid shells to create the Juggernauts of the play's title.

The third issue of Doctor Who - Battles in Time magazine (2006) featured a two-page Dalek Wars image and accompanying text entitled The Battle for the Planet Mechanus, depicting a battle inside the Mechonoid city.

In the graphic novel The Only Good Dalek the Mechonoids are depicted as having been destroyed by the Daleks, with some of their remains making their way to a human space station where research is being conducted on the Daleks in the hopes of finding a way to defeat them.

Movellan 
Movellans are an android species originating from outside the galaxy. They made their first appearance in the Fourth Doctor serial Destiny of the Daleks (1979) as adversaries of the Daleks.

N

Nanogene 

Nanogenes are 'flocking' nanobots that repair damaged tissue. In the two-part story, "The Empty Child" and "The Doctor Dances" (2005), Nanogenes inadvertently use a dead child as a template, reproducing the same injuries on anyone the child touches. The Nanogenes restore those it converted after they are provided with a complete human template.

Q

Quark 

The Quarks appeared in the Second Doctor serial The Dominators by Henry Lincoln and Mervyn Haisman in 1969.

The Quarks were used on Dulkis by the Dominators to enslave and terrorise the indigenous Dulcian population to ensure the drilling of bore holes through the planet's crust. The Dominators planned to use their technology to fire seeds down the holes which would force the core to erupt, thus providing a new fuel source for their fleet.

The Quarks were rectangular, with four arms: one pair which folded into the body, the other pair being retractable. On the end of each arm was a solitary claw. The spherical head was divided into octants; the upper four octants formed the sensory hemisphere, which detected changes in light, heat and motion. At five of the corners of the octants were directional crystal beam transmitters (the sixth corner joined with the robot's extremely short neck). Quarks communicated by means of high-pitched sounds. Their tendency to run out of energy quickly was their primary weakness.

A Quark was also seen in the serial The War Games. The Quarks were designed as an, albeit unsuccessful, attempt at creating a merchandise property, as the Daleks had become earlier.

Quarks are also referred to in the Big Finish Productions audio drama Flip-Flop. When they attacked the space yacht Pinto, the Seventh Doctor and Mel sought leptonite crystals in order to defeat them. It is not known whether the Doctor defeated the Quarks on that occasion. The Quarks were also mentioned, and mocked viciously, in the Doctor Who Unbound audio play Exile.

On the BBC website, Captain Jack's Monster Files entry for the Vespiform mention that they may have been at war with "Quark rebels".

The Quarks were portrayed by children.

Additional information on the Quarks can be found in:
 Harris, M. The Doctor Who Technical Manual 1983. Severn House London/J. M. Dent Pty Ltd Boronia/Australian Broadcasting Corporation Publishing, Sydney.

R

Raston Warrior Robot 

The Raston Warrior Robot was found in the Death Zone on Gallifrey; it could move faster than lightning and was capable of taking out a troop of Cybermen (The Five Doctors) in seconds. It moves so fast that it appears to just teleport from place to place, only visible when it remains stationary. Its own targeting systems are primarily based on detecting movement. Physically, the robot is very lithe, always moving around to scan its environment for targets, and jumping around almost like a ballet dancer when attacking (the actor portraying the robot wears a silver ballet bodysuit, in contrast to the clunky and slow-moving Cybermen). Its face is smooth with no visible eyes. According to the Eighth Doctor Adventures novel The Eight Doctors by Terrance Dicks, the robots were built by an ancient race, older than the Time Lords, who were ultimately destroyed by their own weapons. However, the novel Alien Bodies by Lawrence Miles claims this was false advertising on the part of their manufacturers. It uses atomic radiation as a power source, drawing it from the atmosphere, and locks onto electrical impulses in the brain of its victim, but can become confused if it meets two beings with the same brain pattern. A Raston Warrior Robot appears in the Past Doctor Adventure World Game, also by Dicks, and in the game Destiny of the Doctors.

Russell T Davies, in the March 2008 issue of Doctor Who Magazine, expressed interest in bringing the Raston Warrior Robot back in the new series of Doctor Who, citing the battle between the Robot and the Cybermen in The Five Doctors as one of the finest in the show's history.  This has thus far not transpired.

Roboform 

The Roboforms, also referred to as Pilot Fish by the Tenth Doctor, were scavengers often used by other species for their own means. They were shown allied with the Sycorax and the Racnoss, as well as the Pandorica Alliance., helping to seal the Eleventh Doctor in the Pandorica. The Empress of the Racnoss herself had an armed guard of Roboforms, which the Tenth Doctor infiltrated and knocked out. They frequently disguise themselves as people in Santa Claus outfits to avoid suspicion. They had weaponry disguised as conventional Earth items, such as flamethrowers in the guise of tubas and Christmas Trees capable of spinning fast enough to slice people apart. They are shown capable of detecting Regeneration energy, as shown in The Christmas Invasion. Roboforms naturally have golden bullet shaped heads with two indentations on either side where a human's eye would be.

S

Sandminer Robots 

In The Robots of Death (1977), there were three types of slave Robots, created by a distant human society. The robots were originally built to perform menial tasks. In at least one instance these robots took to raising a human child, Taren Capel. He eventually learned to reprogram the robots to kill humans, and attempted to stage a Robot Revolution.

There were three classes of robots:
 D-class, colloquially known as Dums, were incapable of speech and merely followed orders.
 V-class or Vocs were capable of verbal response and performing slightly more complex tasks, but ultimately no more intelligent than the D-class.
 SV-class, or Supervocs were capable of reason and decision-making, and were used to co-ordinate the other robots in an organisation. Supervocs have been utilised in detective work.

These robots made appearances in:
 The Robots of Death, a Fourth Doctor serial with Leela, written by Chris Boucher
 Corpse Marker, a Fourth Doctor novel with Leela written by Chris Boucher
 Kaldor City: Occam's Razor, a Kaldor City audio play, written by Alan Stevens and Jim Smith
 Kaldor City: Death's Head, a Kaldor City audio play, written by Chris Boucher
 Kaldor City: Hidden Persuaders, a Kaldor City audio play, written by Jim Smith
 Kaldor City: Taren Capel, a Kaldor City audio play, written by Alan Stevens
 Kaldor City: Checkmate, a Kaldor City audio play, written by Alan Stevens
 Kaldor City: Storm Mine, a Kaldor City audio play, written by Daniel O'Mahony
 Robophobia, a Seventh Doctor audio play, written by Nicholas Briggs

Smiler

T

Teselecta 

The Teselecta, first shown in "Let's Kill Hitler", is a robot with the ability to change its appearance. It is commanded by humans, who are shrunk by a miniaturization ray and kept at that size by a compression field. Teselecta are sent through time by an organization called The Justice Department, to remove people it judges deserving of punishment from their established time stream just before their death so they can be tortured, a task they regard as a responsibility that comes with the capability of time travel. In "Let's Kill Hitler", Amy Pond and Rory Williams are trapped within a Teselecta and chased by its robotic "immune system". Wrist-bands worn by the crew serve as reverse antibodies, preventing the "immune system" from attacking them, and anybody not wearing one with proper identification status is incinerated. Later in the episode, the crew of the Teselecta is evacuated by what appears to be a trans-mat beam.

The Teselecta reappear in the Series 6 finale "The Wedding of River Song". The Eleventh Doctor is supposed to be killed at Lake Silencio, Utah, but he hides with his TARDIS inside the robot, which takes his form, making it appear that he is killed.

Trine-E

W

War Machines (WOTAN)

Y

Yeti

Z

Zu-Zana

References 

 Doctor Who
Robots
Doctor Who
Robots